Harapan is the fifth studio album from Malaysian singer Francissca Peter released in 1988.

Awards and recognitions
 The album released by Warner Music Malaysia achieves Platinum status.  
 Fran's songs featured in Warner Music Malaysia's release "14 Award Winning Songs" from various Malaysian artistes.
 Most famous duet song "Kehebatan Cinta" with Malaysian King of Pop, Jamal Abdillah.
 Song entitled "Diriku Terbelenggu" won 1st runner-up in Song Festival Award "Anugerah Juara Lagu".

Track listing

References

External links 
 Official Website

1988 albums
Francissca Peter albums
Warner Music Group albums
Malay-language albums